Chyme or chymus (from Greek χυμός khymos, "juice") is the semi-fluid mass of partly digested food that is expelled by a person's or an animal’s stomach, through the pyloric valve, into the duodenum (the beginning of the small intestine).

Chyme results from the mechanical and chemical breakdown of a bolus and consists of partially digested food, water, hydrochloric acid, and various digestive enzymes. Chyme slowly passes through the pyloric sphincter and into the duodenum, where the extraction of nutrients begins. Depending on the quantity and contents of the meal, the stomach will digest the food into chyme in some time from 40 minutes to 3 hours.

With a pH of approximately 2, chyme emerging from the stomach is very acidic. The duodenum secretes a hormone, cholecystokinin (CCK), which causes the gall bladder to contract, releasing alkaline bile into the duodenum. CCK also causes the release of digestive enzymes from the pancreas. The duodenum is a short section of the small intestine located between the stomach and the rest of the small intestine. The duodenum also produces the hormone secretin to stimulate the pancreatic secretion of large amounts of sodium bicarbonate, which then raises pH of the chyme to 7. The chyme then moves through the jejunum and the ileum, where digestion progresses, and the nonuseful portion continues onward into the large intestine. The duodenum is protected by a thick layer of mucus and the neutralizing actions of the sodium bicarbonate and bile.

At a pH of 7, the enzymes that were present from the stomach are no longer active. This then leads into the further breakdown of the nutrients still present by anaerobic bacteria, which at the same time help to package the remains. These bacteria also help synthesize vitamin B and vitamin K, which will be absorbed along with other nutrients.

Properties
Chyme has a low pH that is countered by the production of bile, helping to further digest food. Chyme is part liquid and part solid: a thick semifluid mass of partially digested food and digestive secretions that is formed in the stomach and small intestine during digestion. Chyme also contains cells from the mouth and esophagus that slough off from the mechanical action of chewing and swallowing.

Path of chyme
After hours of mechanical and chemical digestion, food has been reduced into chyme. As particles of food become small enough, they are passed out of the stomach at regular intervals into the small intestine, which stimulates the pancreas to release fluid containing a high concentration of bicarbonate. This fluid neutralizes the gastric juices, which can damage the lining of the intestine and result in duodenal ulcer. Other secretions from the pancreas, gallbladder, liver, and glands in the intestinal wall help in digestion.

When food particles are sufficiently reduced in size and composition, they are absorbed by the intestinal wall and transported to the bloodstream. Some food material is passed from the small intestine to the large intestine. In the large intestine, bacteria break down any proteins and starches in chyme that were not digested fully in the small intestine.

When all of the nutrients have been absorbed from chyme, the remaining waste material changes into semisolids that are called feces. The feces pass to the rectum, to be stored until ready to be discharged from the body during defecation.

Uses

The chyme of an unweaned calf is the defining ingredient of pajata, a traditional Roman recipe.

See also 
 Vomiting

References 

Digestive system
Body fluids